The Ohio River Lacrosse Conference was a National Collegiate Athletic Association Division III men's and women's lacrosse conference located primarily in the midwestern United States. The conference was disbanded after the 2017-18 season.

Teams
The men's lacrosse teams of the Ohio River Lacrosse Conference comprise:
The Bethany College Bison
The Hanover College Panthers
The Mount St. Joseph University Lions
The Saint Vincent College Bearcats
The Thiel College Tomcats
The Transylvania University Pioneers
The Washington & Jefferson College Presidents
The Westminster College Titans

The women's lacrosse teams of the Ohio River Lacrosse Conference comprise:
The Franklin College Grizzlies
The Hanover College Panthers
The Mount St. Joseph University Lions
The Saint Vincent College Bearcats
The Thiel College Tomcats
The Thomas More College Saints
The Transylvania University Pioneers
The Washington & Jefferson College Presidents
The Waynesburg University Yellow Jackets

See also
Lacrosse

References

External links

Ohio River Lacrosse Conference website
National Collegiate Athletic Association website
NCAA Division III
NCAA men's lacrosse
NCAA women's lacrosse

College lacrosse leagues in the United States